Pedro Páramo  is a novel written by Mexican writer Juan Rulfo. The novel tells the story of Juan Preciado, a man who promises his mother on her deathbed to meet Preciado's father for the first time in the town of Comala, only to come across a literal ghost town. That is, populated by spectral characters. During the course of the novel, these ghostly inhabitants reveal details about life and afterlife in Comala, including that of Preciado's reckless father: Pedro Páramo, and his centrality for the town. Initially, the novel was met with cold critical reception and sold only two thousand copies during the first four years; later, however, the book became highly acclaimed. Páramo was a key influence on Latin American writers such as Gabriel García Márquez. Pedro Páramo has been translated into more than 30 different languages and the English version has sold more than a million copies in the United States.

Gabriel García Márquez has said that he felt blocked as a novelist after writing his first four books and that it was only his life-changing discovery of Pedro Páramo in 1961 that opened his way to the composition of his masterpiece, One Hundred Years of Solitude. Moreover, García Márquez claimed that he "could recite the whole book, forwards and backwards."  Jorge Luis Borges considered Pedro Páramo to be one of the greatest texts written in any language.

Plot
The novel is set in the fictional town of Comala and its surroundings, a reference to the real town of Comala in the Mexican state of Colima, close to Juan Rulfo's home land.

The story begins with the first person account of Juan Preciado, who promises his mother at her deathbed that he will return to Comala to meet his father, Pedro Páramo. Juan suggests that he did not intend to keep this promise until he was overtaken by visions of his mother. His narration is interspersed with fragments of dialogue from the life of his father, who lived in a time when Comala was a robust, living town, instead of the ghost town it has become. Juan encounters one person after another in Comala, but the narrative is often ambiguous as to whether conversations are real, visions, dreams or hallucinations. Midway through the novel, Preciado dies while still looking for his father. From this point on most of the stories happen in the time of Pedro Páramo.

Most of the characters in Juan's narration (Dolores Preciado, Eduviges Dyada, Abundio Martínez, Susana San Juan, and Damiana Cisneros) are also presented in an omniscient narration but much less subjectively. The two major competing narrative voices present alternative visions of Comala, one living and one full of the spirits of the dead.  The omniscient narration provides details of the life of Pedro Páramo, from his early youthful idealization of Susana San Juan to his rise to power upon his coming of age to his tyrannical abuses and womanizing, and, finally, to his death. Pedro is cruel, and though he raises one of his illegitimate sons, Miguel Páramo (whose mother dies giving birth), Pedro does not love his father (who dies when Pedro is a child) or either of his two wives.

His only love, from a very young age, is that of Susana San Juan, a childhood friend who leaves Comala with her father at a young age. Pedro Páramo bases all of his decisions on, and puts all of his attention into trying to get Susana San Juan to return to Comala. When she finally does, Pedro makes her his, but she has become mad and constantly mourns her dead husband Florencio and spends her time sleeping and dreaming about him.  Pedro realizes that Susana San Juan belongs to a different world that he will never understand.

When she dies the church bells toll incessantly, provoking a fiesta in Comala. Pedro buries his only true love, and angry at the indifference of the town, swears vengeance. As the most politically and economically influential person in the town, Pedro crosses his arms and refuses to continue working, and the town dies of hunger. This is why in Juan's narration, we see a dead, dry Comala instead of the luscious place it was when Pedro Páramo was a boy.

Plot summary and timeline 
The sequence of events for the plot is broken up in the work in a nonlinear fashion and is at times difficult to discern and the same occurs with the characters as it is often impossible at first for the reader even to tell which characters are alive or dead. Each plot event is stated and then defined in more detail. 
 Fulgor Sedano arrives at Media Luna: His old patrón, Lucas, told him that Pedro is totally useless and that he should go and get a new job when he dies.
 Pedro's grandfather dies: His family prays for him after his death to help shorten his time in Purgatory. Pedro himself does not feel like doing this and instead thinks about Susana.
 Susana San Juan and Pedro Páramo play during their childhood: Pedro thinks about this often. They would fly kites near the village, and Pedro would help Susana fly hers. He is scolded for taking so long in the outhouse by his mother while he recalls this event.
 Señora San Juan dies. This event is assumed since Dorotea cannot remember seeing Susana with her mother ever. Susana also talks about how her mother died. She recounts that she was sickly and never visited anyone and how no one came to her funeral. Susana laments about having to pay for Gregorian masses for her mother and the heartless transaction of money required to be able to do that.
The San Juan family moves to the mining region. Not much is known about this other than they lived there for many years and later returned to Comala.
 Susana and her Father explore the Andromeda mine. Señor San Juan drops Susana, at the end of a rope, down into the old mine shaft and tells her to look for gold coins. She is unable to find any, only a skeleton.
Lucas Páramo was killed: He was shot at a wedding by a bullet that was meant for the bridegroom. Pedro later killed most of the people at that wedding. He also permanently crippled a man, which Juan hears about in the grave.
 Florencio dies (exact time unknown). Susana's husband dies, and she tragically becomes mad. She still thinks that he is living. She stayed up late that night waiting for him, but he never arrived at home, and in the morning she found out that he was dead.
 Fulgor Sedano tells Pedro about his father's debts: Sedano had avoided Pedro in the past because of the warnings of Lucas but stayed on the hacienda because he loved the land. He has to tell Pedro about the debts. Pedro answers, "I’m not interested in how much, just to whom." They concoct a plan to get Dolores Preciado to marry him to eliminate the debt to her family.
 Sedano and Dolores Preciado talk: Sedano tells her a lie about how much Pedro had wanted her and that he is really a very shy man. To this, she replies that she is having her period and cannot be married so soon. Sedano is scornful of this reason.
 Osorio warns Dolores Preciado not to sleep with Pedro on her wedding night. She begs Eduviges Dyada to go and sleep with Pedro in her place. Eduviges does this, but Pedro is too drunk to have sex.
 Miguel Páramo is killed by his horse: He is going to Contla to visit his girlfriend and to have sex with her when he attempts to save time on his journey by jumping his horse over a fence that his father had built. His horse's name is El Colorado, and it was said that this horse would be the death of him one day. His ghost came back to tell Eduviges about this.
 Miguel Páramo is absolved by the Church: Father Rentería absolves him after Pedro Páramo gives him some gold coins. The priest realizes that he cannot afford to anger the leader of the town, Pedro, by not doing so. The priest is upset that he absolved his brother's killer and niece's rapist.
 Father Rentería talks to his confessor: He is not forgiven of his sins as he did not give absolution to the dying. The other priest chastises him for not doing his job and saying that the people of Comala believe in God more out of superstition rather than actual adoration. They talk about how the land is bitter in Mexico.
 Dorotea confesses: Dorotea goes to Father Rentería and tells him that she was the one who was procuring girls for Miguel Páramo. She is drunk at Miguel's wake. She tells the priest that she had brought girls for Miguel for years and years and that she had lost count of how many she had gotten. The priest said that there is nothing that he is able to do about it. He cannot forgive her and says that she will not "go to Heaven now."
 Toribio Aldrete is hanged: He was plotted against by Fulgor Sedano and Pedro Páramo, who accused him of "falsifying boundaries". Toribio owned some land that Páramo wanted to add to his hacienda. Pedro orders Sedano to write charges for Aldrete's conviction. One night Aldrete is drunk and goes into Eduviges Dyada's house (the corner room) and is hanged. He is left to "turn to leather" and to never have salvation. The key to the room is thrown out. Ironically, Eduviges gives Juan Preciado this room in her house in which to stay the night. He then hears an echo of the past while sleeping and awakens suddenly.
 Dolores Preciado (Juan's mother) leaves Pedro Páramo and the Media Luna hacienda: She is looking at a crow in the sky and says that she wishes that she was this bird and could fly to her sister's house in the city. Pedro becomes angry enough to finally dismiss her. She leaves and never returns. She and Pedro are never divorced.
 Eduviges Dyada kills herself: Her sister, Maria Dyada, tells Father Rentería that it was out of despair. "She died of her sorrows."  But the priest laments that all her good work has gone by the wayside and that she will be unable to get into heaven. The priest says that only with prayers will she be able to get into heaven, and even then nothing is certain.
 Start of the Mexican Revolution
 Return of the San Juans: Señor Bartolomé San Juan refuses to read the letters from Pedro asking him to come and be his administrator. He is finally found and comes back to Comala only because the Revolution makes the countryside dangerous. He finds out the Pedro wants only his daughter.
 Señor San Juan dies: Before, while working, he had realized that he would die and that he must die. Additionally, Sedano and Pedro conspire to have him killed. He dies and goes to heaven. His "spirit" comes to say goodbye to Susana. Susana laughs that he came to say goodbye to her while Justina cries. He must have been killed since his ghost does not haunt the town.
 Fulgor Sedano is killed: A scared man comes to Pedro's house with the news. He says that the revolutionaries stopped him and Sedano and told Sedano to run and tell Pedro that they were coming for him and then shot him as he ran.
 Pedro joins Revolution: He calls the local revolutionaries to his house for supper. He promises to give them much money and support, even more than they had asked for. By doing this he managed to remain safe and prevent the soldiers from attacking his lands.
 El Tilcuate, the revolutionary leader, and Pedro talk: Pedro tells Damasio that he has no more money to give to him to fight and that he should go and raid a larger town to get supplies.
 Susana San Juan dies: She refuses absolution by the priest. She is simply waiting for death to come and take her. Father Rentería gives her communion, but she is semi-delirious and is talking to Florencio. Susana says that she "wants to be left in peace". She dies without receiving the last sacraments.
 The party: The people of Comala have a large fiesta, which is full of drinking and wild revelry. This greatly annoyed Pedro, who wanted people to mourn his loss of Susana. He says, "I will cross my arms and Comala will die of hunger." And that is what happened
 Refugia Martínez dies: She was the wife of Abundio. He had stayed up all night with her, and she died in the morning. He is out to get drunk to forget his troubles. He goes to the Villalpando's store to do so.
 Damiana Cisneros's slaying: Abundio Martínez frightens Cisneros, and she begins to scream. In his drunken state he becomes confused and begins to stab her. While doing so, he thinks about his wife and that he only wanted money for her burial. He is then captured and dragged back into town.
 Pedro Páramo dies: He is stabbed by his illegitimate son, Abundio. Pedro dies after thinking about Susana. It can be discerned that with her death, he died, too. He realizes that he cannot move his arms and the ghost (apparently) of  Cisneros comes to him, and then he dies.
 Dolores Preciado dies: Her death wish is for Juan to find his father and get what he deserves from him after all of these years.
 Juan Preciado comes to Comala: He meets the ghosts of Abundio, Eduviges, and Damiana.
 He is taken in by Donis and his sister/wife: He is scared to death.
 Dorotea and Juan die, buried in the same grave.

Themes
A major theme in the book is people's hopes and dreams as sources of the motivation they need to succeed. Hope is each character's central motive for action. As Dolores tells her son, Juan, to return to Comala, she hopes that he will find his father and get what he deserves after all of these years.  Despair is the other main theme in the novel. Each character's hopes lead to despair since none of their attempts to attain their goals are successful.

Juan goes to Comala instilled with the hope that he will meet and finally get to know his father. He fails to accomplish this and dies fearful, having lost all hope.

Pedro hopes that Susana San Juan will return to him after so long. He was infatuated with her as a young boy and recalls flying kites with her in his youth. When she finally returns to him, she has gone mad and behaves as though her first husband were still alive. Nevertheless, Pedro hopes that she will eventually come to love him. Dorotea says that Pedro truly loved Susana and wanted nothing but the best for her.

Father Rentería lives in hope that he will someday be able to fully fulfill his vows as a Catholic priest, telling Pedro that his son will not go to heaven, instead of pardoning him for his many sins in exchange for a lump of gold.

Ghosts and the ethereal nature of the truth are also recurrent themes in the text. When Juan arrives in Comala it is a ghost town, yet this is only gradually revealed to the reader. For example, in an episode with Damiana Cisneros, Juan talks to her believing that she is alive. They walk through the town together until he becomes suspicious as to how she knew that he was in town, and he nervously asks, "Damiana Cisneros, are you alive?" This encounter shows the truth as fleeting, always changing, and impossible to pin down. It is difficult to truly know who is dead and who is alive in Comala.

Sometimes the order and nature of events that occur in the work are not as they first seem. For example, midway through the book, the original chronology is subverted when the reader finds out that much of what has preceded was a flashback to an earlier time.

Interpretation
Critics primarily consider Pedro Páramo as either a work of magic realism or a precursor to later works of magic realism; this is the standard Latin American interpretation.  However, magical realism is a term coined to note the juxtaposition of the surreal to the mundane, with each bearing traits of the other. It is a means of adding surreal or supernatural qualities to a written work while avoiding total disbelief. Pedro Páramo is unlike other works of this type because the primary narrator states clearly in the second paragraph of the novel that his mind has filled with dreams and that he has given flight to illusion and that a world has formed in his mind around the hopes of finding a man named Pedro Páramo. Likewise, several sections into this narration, Juan Preciado states that his head has filled with noises and voices. He is unable to distinguish living persons from apparitions. Certain critics believe that particular qualities of the novel, including the narrative fragmentation, the physical fragmentation of characters, and the auditory and visual hallucinations described by the primary narrator, suggest that this novel's journey and visions may be more readily associated with the sort of breakdown of the senses present in schizophrenia or schizophrenia-like conditions rather than with magical realism.

Meaning of title
It is obvious that the title underscores the importance of the character of Pedro Páramo. Pedro is a very important character, and his life and decisions that he makes are key to the survival of the town of Comala. His last name is symbolic because it means "barren plain" or "wasteland", which is what the town of Comala becomes as a result of his manipulation.
He is not only responsible for the economic well-being of the town but also for the existence of many of its inhabitants. His offspring includes Abundio, Miguel, and Juan, along with countless others. He is commonly seen raping women, and even Dorotea cannot keep track of all the women he has slept with.
He is also responsible for the security of the town. He strikes a deal with the revolutionary army and does so mainly in his own self-interest and for protection. But being the owner of such a large swath of land, he is, by extension, in charge of the physical well-being of the town. 
An example of his power is when he decides to allow Comala to starve and do nothing with the fields and with the crops. The town withers on his apathy and indifference. 
The entire work centers around his actions, appetites and desires. He holds the town of Comala in the proverbial palm of his hand.

Characters

Main characters

Pedro Páramo
Pedro Páramo is both protagonist and antagonist since his acts are at cross-purposes. He is capable of decisive action, like when he eliminated his debt and took over more land, but is unable to use that decisiveness to do any good for the community. He is like a tragic hero in the way that he longs for Susana and is totally unable to get over her death. His one fatal flaw is her. He cannot function without her or the incentive of her. Pedro serves as a fertility god figurehead in the work. He not only literally impregnates many of the town's women, but he has many children (the priest brings many to his doorstep). He also is in charge of the well-being of Comala, but also can "cross his arms" and let Comala die. This shows that he has the power of life and fertility over the town. Pedro's name has great significance in the work. Pedro is derived from the Latin , meaning 'rock', and Páramo, meaning 'barren plain'. This is ironic since in the end of the work Pedro collapses "like a pile of rocks" after observing what his land had become.

Susana San Juan
She is the love of Pedro's life. They grew up together. Her mother died friendless, and later her father Bartolomé is killed in the Andromeda mine by Sedano so that Pedro can marry her. She loved her first husband very much and went mad when he died. She thinks that he is still living, and she "talks" to him several times in the work. She appeared to have loved him for his body and not for his personality. She might have had sex with Pedro, but it is apparent that he wanted to have her. They were never married since he had never divorced Dolores. He is full of grief when she dies and refuses to work anymore and lets the town die. She is commonly portrayed and symbolized as the rain and water. In the passages that she is in, there is a backdrop with it raining. Such an example of this is the scene with Justina, Susana, and the cat. The entire background is the rain; it is raining torrents, and the valley is flooded.

Juan Preciado – narrator
Juan is one of the two narrators in the work. He recounts his story for the first half of the work, up until his death. He comes to Comala in order to find his father, his mother's last wish. He finds the town abandoned and dies of fright from the ghosts. He is then buried in the same grave as Dorotea, whom he talks with. It is apparent that he dies without the proper sacraments and is now stuck in purgatory.

Fulgor Sedano – mentor
He is the administrator of the Media Luna. Initially warned by Pedro's father not to trust him, he eventually becomes enforcing hand of Pedro's schemes. He had been around the estate for many years serving the former patrons, Pedro's father Lucas and Lucas's father before that. He knows what to do and how to do it and boasts a number of achievements, including getting Dolores to marry Pedro. He is killed by a band of revolutionaries who view him as an embodiment of the privileged estate that they are fighting against. He also is responsible for having Toribio Aldrete hanged because he was trying to get the land surveyed to prove his right to some of it.

Miguel Páramo
He and Juan are both sons of Pedro Páramo. Miguel is the only son recognized by Pedro and was thus being groomed as the next Páramo heir. Miguel's character is the exact opposite to Juan. He is wild and a rapist, while Juan is quiet and respectful of women. He is fearless, whereas Juan dies of fear. He has a horse and rides it often, whereas Juan does not and has to travel by foot. His wantonness contrasts the calmness of Juan despite their shared parentage.
Additionally, he is known for liking loose women and for murdering Ana's father. He also rapes Ana when he goes to her to apologize to her for killing him. He is thrown from his horse when going to another village to meet his current lover.

Dorotea – narrator
Town's beggar. She is the second narrator in the work. She tells the story of Comala before Pedro died after she is buried in the grave with Juan. Her storytelling dominates the second half of the work. She was known for being homeless and living on the charity of the people in the town. She had always tried to have children but had "the heart of a mother but a womb of a whore". She was known for her eccentric behavior by thinking that she had had a baby.

Father Rentería
Town's priest. He is really not the main character, but he possesses all the characteristics of one; for which he could considered an antihero. He tries to stand up to Pedro and not give absolution to his son, Miguel. He has only the best intentions in mind but is unable to carry them out. His brother was killed by Miguel, and his niece was raped by Miguel as well when he came to apologize to her. He takes some gold to absolve Miguel, and he feels poorly about it, throwing himself in a corner and crying to the Lord.
 
He goes to another town to try to get himself forgiven of his sins so that he could continue to give the sacraments to the people of Comala. The other priest refuses, but they talk about how everything that grows in their region tastes sour and bitter. 
It is directly Father Rentería's fault that so many souls are stuck in Comala. He had failed in his duty to absolve those people and administer the last rite to them, and thus, they died and were unable to go to heaven. 
He is later mentioned as having joined the Cristero War.

Minor characters

Eduviges Dyada
Town's prostitute and good friend of Dolores Preciado. They promised to die together and help each other through the afterlife. She had died years ago and greets Juan when he arrives at Comala. She tells him of how she almost "came within a hair of being his mother" since she had to go and sleep with Pedro on their wedding night. She tells of her relationship and relations with Miguel Páramo and how it was she who saw his ghost before it left. Her sister, María Dyada, tells the priest that her suicide was out of despair and that she was a really good woman. He refuses to help her, and thus, her ghost remains in the town and purgatory. She dies with the idea that Abundio is a good man and does not know about him murdering Damiana.

Dolores Preciado
She was Juan's mother. She was wooed into marriage to Pedro by Sedano who said he thought of nothing but her all day and night and that her eyes were beautiful. Pedro owed her family the most money of all the other families, and her sisters had already moved to the city. She was married to annul the debt. Later, she is staring at a buzzard and wishes to be like it so that she could fly to her sister in the city. Pedro gets mad enough and dismisses her for good. They are never officially divorced. Her dying wish is for Juan to go and see his father and "make him pay for all those years he put us out of his mind".

Abundio Martínez
He's another illegitimate son of Pedro's who works as the town's mail carrier. He is deaf because a rocket once went off near his ear. After that he did not talk much, and he became depressed. Later, his wife dies. He goes to get drunk at a local bar. Upon leaving he sees Damiana Cisneros and asks her for some money to bury his wife. He startles her, and she begins to scream. He then kills her, is captured, vomits, and is dragged to town. Eduviges calls him a good man.

Inocencio Osorio
He is the town's seer. He is the one who tells Dolores not to sleep with Pedro on her wedding night. His nickname is "Cockleburr" since he is well known to be able to stick to any horse and break it.

Damiana Cisneros
She is the cook at the Media Luna and the ghost who takes Juan from Eduviges's house on that first night. She is sad to hear that Eduviges is still wandering the earth. Juan takes a while to realize that she is really a ghost and for a time, thinks that she is still alive. She was murdered by Abundio. She was also one of Dolores's good friends, and Juan knew about her when he arrived at Comala.

Toribio Aldrete
He is a property surveyor. He was splitting and dividing up Pedro's land and was going to build fences. He is stopped by a plot by Pedro and Sedano. They plot to try to stop him from doing the survey and draw up a warrant against him. Sedano goes to Eduviges's house one night with a drunken Aldrete and hangs him and throws away the keys to the room. He remains there in spirit and wakes Juan on his first night in Comala with his death screams.

Donis and his wife/sister
These two are some of the last living people in the town. Donis is suspicious of Juan and his motives for being there and thinks that he is a serious criminal, perhaps a murderer, and does not want him to spend the night. Donis is engaged in an incestous relationship with his sister, started in an attempt to repopulate the town, although they once asked a bishop riding through town to marry them which he furiously refused, demanding they stop their relationship and "live like men". His wife/sister starts to like Juan after the first night and does a little extra to try to get him some more food since they have so little. She trades some of the old sheets for food and coffee with her older sister. Donis is glad that Juan showed up since he could now leave the town and have his wife/sister taken care of. Years ago, it is recounted that a bishop went through and refused to marry the two.

Justina
She is Susana's caregiver. She has taken care of her for many years, since she was born. She cried when Susana was dying, and Susana told her to stop crying. Justina is scared one day by the ghost of Bartolomé, who tells her to leave the town since Susana would be well cared for.

See also
Pedro Páramo (1967 film)

Notes

References

Zepeda, Jorge. La recepción inicial de Pedro Páramo (1955–1963). México: Fundación Juan Rulfo / Editorial RM, 2005. 378 pp. .

External links

Pedro Páramo (2004) the theatre by Theatre Formation Paribartak of India
 Ghosts of Comala (2012), Alex Torío studio album inspired by the novel

1955 novels
Mexican novels
Mexican magic realism novels
Novels set in Mexico
Fondo de Cultura Económica books
Mexican novels adapted into films